Black ice is hazardous frozen water.

Black Ice may also refer to:

Film
 Black Ice (1992 film), a thriller shot in Winnipeg
 Black Ice (1994 film), by Stan Brakhage
 Black Ice (2007 film), a Finnish film
 Black Ice (2022 film), a Canadian documentary film directed by Hubert Davis
 On Black Ice (1995), Belarusian drama based on short stories by Vasil Bykau

Literature

 Black Ice (memoir), a 1991 memoir by American author Lorene Cary
 The Black Ice, a 1993 book written by Michael Connelly
 Black Ice (Sussex novel), a 1997 novel by Lucy Sussex
 Black Ice (Fitzpatrick novel), a 2014 novel by Becca Fitzpatrick
 Black ICE, lethal data protection mechanisms, originally used in Neuromancer by William Gibson but since widely adopted in the cyberpunk genre

Music
 Black Ice (band), a deathrock band
 Black Ice (album), by AC/DC or the album's title track
 Black Ice World Tour, a world concert tour by AC/DC in support of the album
 "Black Ice", a song by Nick Mason and Rick Fenn from the album Profiles
 "Black Ice", a song by Creo (Artist) from the EP Album "Odyssey".

Other uses
 Black Ice beers, New Zealand beer produced by Lion (Australasian company)
 Black Ice (synchronized skating team), a synchronized skating team from Ontario
 Superionic water, a phase of water under extreme temperatures and pressures that is black in color
 Stratolaunch Black Ice, a proposed air-launched spaceplane

See also
 Black (disambiguation)
 Ice (disambiguation)